Alfred Erskine Gathorne-Hardy (27 February 1845 – 11 November 1918), styled The Honourable from 1878, was a British Conservative Member of Parliament.

Gathorne-Hardy was the third son of Gathorne Gathorne-Hardy, 1st Earl of Cranbrook, and Jane Orr.  Born Alfred Hardy, he assumed by Royal licence the additional surname of Gathorne in 1878 like the rest of his family.  The same year he was elected to the House of Commons for Canterbury, a seat he held until 1880, when the constituency was suspended.  He returned to Parliament in 1886 when he was returned for East Grinstead, and continued to represent this constituency until 1895.

An observant naturalist he was also a keen shot and fisherman.  In 1900 Longmans published his "Autumns in Argyle with Rod and Gun", which is a collection of reminiscences of 30 years worth of sporting visits to his brother-in-law's estate at Poltalloch in Argyll.  This  estate included historic Dunadd as well as Castle Sween, Carnasserie Castle, and Duntrune - the family seat of the Clan Malcolm.  The book has recently been reissued in a facsimile edition.

Gathorne-Hardy died in November 1918, aged 73.

Notes

References
 Kidd, Charles, Williamson, David (eds.) Debrett's Peerage and Baronetage (1990 edition). New York: St Martin's Press, 1990, 
 Williamson, David (ed.), Debrett's Peerage and Baronetage (107th ed.) (London 2002)

External links 
 
 

1845 births
1918 deaths
Conservative Party (UK) MPs for English constituencies
UK MPs 1874–1880
UK MPs 1886–1892
UK MPs 1892–1895
Younger sons of earls
Politics of Canterbury
Gathorne-Hardy family